Cravon Tommy Gillespie (born July 31, 1996) is an American professional track and field sprinter who specializes in the 100 metres and 200 metres races. He represented the United States at the 2019 World Athletics Championships, earning a gold medal in the 4 × 100 metres relay.

College career
Following stints at Monrovia High School and Mount San Antonio College, Gillespie became an All-American multiple times for the Oregon Ducks.

2018
In 2018, Gillespie won the PAC-12 100m title and finished 2nd in the 200m. He qualified for the 100m final at the Outdoor NCAA Championships, where he finished fourth in 10.27 seconds.

2019
After finishing 4th in the 60m at NCAA Indoors, Gillespie's breakthrough came outdoors; he defended his PAC-12 100m title in 9.97 seconds, breaking 10 seconds for the first time. He also won the 200m in 20.17 seconds. At NCAAs, he was 2nd in both 100m and 200m, setting Oregon school records of 9.93 and 19.93 seconds, respectively.

International career

2019
On June 14th, 2019, just 7 days after his breakthrough NCAA performances, Gillespie turned professional and signed with Nike. He focused on the 100 metres for the rest of the season, finishing 4th at the US Championships and qualifying for the US' World Championship 4 × 100 metres relay team. He was also selected to represent USA at the 2019 Pan American Games, where he finished 6th in the 100 metres and won bronze in the 4 × 100 metres relay.

Gillespie was scheduled to compete in the 100 meters at the 2019 World Athletics Championships. He ultimately did not race individually, but did race as part of the 4 × 100 metres relay heats; he did not race in the relay final, but due to racing in the heats was awarded a gold medal.

He entered the Championships with a tie for the fifth fastest time in the world.

2020
On August 6th, 2020, Gillespie won his first race as a professional at the PVAMU Back To The Track Series 3 in Prairie View, Texas.

2021
After a rocky start to his season, Gillespie returned to Mt. San Antonio for the USATF Golden Games, where he would compete against Seattle Seahawks wide receiver DK Metcalf in the 100 metres. He won his heat with ease in 10.11 seconds, then won the final in a season's best of 9.96 seconds; his first sub-10 since NCAAS two years prior. He then set his sights on the Olympic Trials, where he finished 6th in 10.00 seconds. He also competed in the 2020 Summer Olympics in Tokyo, Japan where he ran the anchor leg of the 4x100m relay team also featuring Trayvon Bromell, Fred Kerley, and Ronnie Baker.

References

External links
 
 
 
 
 
 

1996 births
Living people
American male sprinters
Oregon Ducks men's track and field athletes
World Athletics Championships athletes for the United States
World Athletics Championships medalists
World Athletics Championships winners
Pan American Games medalists in athletics (track and field)
Pan American Games bronze medalists for the United States
Athletes (track and field) at the 2019 Pan American Games
Medalists at the 2019 Pan American Games
Athletes (track and field) at the 2020 Summer Olympics
Olympic track and field athletes of the United States